Swami Sarvapriyananda (Pre-Monastic name Biswarup Palit) is a Hindu monk (sannyasi) belonging to the Ramakrishna Order. He is the current resident Swami and head of the Vedanta Society of New York, a position he has been serving since January 2017.

Early life and education 
Swami Sarvapriyananda was born in Kolkata and grew up in Bhubhaneshwar in the Indian state of Odisha to a pious Bengali family. From childhood onwards, he was inclined towards spirituality and was inspired by the lives of Sri Ramakrishna and Swami Vivekananda. His family was also devoutly religious. His parents and grandparents were initiated devotees in the Ramakrishna Order tradition. He has stated that his first goal in life was to become a pilot and the second was to find God, with the second goal later becoming his only goal. Sarvapriyananda joined the Ramakrishna Order in 1994 and took his monastic vows as sanyasa diksha was bestowed upon him
by Swami Ranganathananda in 2004. His family, at first, objected to his decision to become a monk but later accepted his decision. After passing school, he completed his Business Management degree from Xavier Institute of Management, Bhubaneswar.

Life after Sannyasa 
Swami Sarvapriyananda served as assistant minister of the Vedanta Society of Southern California in 2015. He was later appointed head of the Vedanta Society of New York, a position he has been serving since 6 January 2017. Swami Tathagatananda was his predecessor. He was in the first group of Hindu swamis to participate as a Nagral Fellow for the year 2019–20 at Harvard Divinity School.

Before being posted to the Hollywood Temple, he served as an acharya or teacher at Monastic probationer training center, Belur Math. He also served the Ramakrishna Order by becoming the vice principal of Deoghar Vidyapith Higher Secondary School and becoming Principal of Ramakrishna Mission Shikshanamandira (teacher-training college), Belur Math.

Teachings 
Sarvapriyananda frequently speaks at symposia and events focused on Advaita Vedanta teachings, and has participated in discussions with other non-dualists. He is a very strong proponent and scholar of the Indian Upanishad school of thought and the philosophy or Darshan, particularly of Self and Consciousness contained in them. He has delivered many lectures on the same topic. Fortune India mentions Sarvapriyananda as "one of the best known lecturers of the Vedanta in the world today". Speaking with Time on the occasion of the International Day of Yoga in 2018, Sarvapriyananda stated that "doing (yoga) the right way can change the way you live, work and love" while criticising the "vulgarisation and distortion of yoga today".

See also 

 Ranganathananda
 Swami Tathagatananda
 Swami Samarpanananda
 Mahendranath Gupta
 Vedanta Society of New York
 Vedanta Society of Southern California
 Advaita Vedanta
 Neo-Vedanta

References 

People from Bhubaneswar
Monastic disciples of Ramakrishna
Indian Hindu monks
Year of birth missing (living people)
Living people